Nerophis is a genus of pipefishes native to the eastern Atlantic Ocean.

Species
There are currently three recognized species in this genus:

References

 
Syngnathidae
 
Marine fish genera
Taxa named by Constantine Samuel Rafinesque